Dennis Dias (born December 12, 1946) is an American guitarist, best known for being a founding member of Steely Dan.

Career
Dias was working with his own band out of his basement in Hicksville, New York, when he placed an ad in The Village Voice in the summer of 1970 that read: "Looking for keyboardist and bassist. Must have jazz chops! Assholes need not apply". Donald Fagen and Walter Becker responded to the advertisement. 

They joined his band and immediately began playing their own material. Dias fired the rest of the band, and the three of them moved to California, adding drummer Jim Hodder, guitarist Jeff "Skunk" Baxter, and vocalist David Palmer before recording for ABC/Dunhill Records as Steely Dan. Dias recorded as a permanent member of the band on 1972's Can't Buy a Thrill (with an electric sitar solo on the song "Do It Again"), on 1973's Countdown to Ecstasy, and on 1974's Pretzel Logic. 

Following a tour promoting Pretzel Logic, Becker and Fagen decided to break the band up and use session musicians on future albums.  Though no longer a member of the band, Dias continued to work with them as a session guitarist, appearing on 1975's Katy Lied, 1976's The Royal Scam, and 1977's Aja. In 1991 he joined Toto on their Summer Festival Tour. He also recorded with Wayne Shorter, Wilfrido Vargas and Pete Christlieb. Some of Dias's original material was recorded on a 1999 CD called Matter of Time, with Lisa Jason (Vocals) and Andy Bergsten (Bass) as the core of the band. 

As of 2012, Dias was playing with Spanky and Our Gang. In 2014, he was playing with Denny Dias and Friends, a Boston-based band formed with Lisa Jason and Andy Bergsten with session musicians from around the country. In 2015, they planned a tour that included the Iridium in NYC.

Discography
With Steely Dan
 Can't Buy a Thrill (ABC, 1972)
 Countdown to Ecstasy (ABC, 1973)
 Pretzel Logic (ABC, 1974)
 Katy Lied (ABC, 1975)
 The Royal Scam (ABC, 1976)
 Aja (ABC, 1977)

With others

 Soundtrack to You've Got to Walk It Like You Talk It or You'll Lose That Beat (1971) with Walter Becker and Donald Fagen, credited as Denny Diaz
 David Garfield and Friends, Tribute to Jeff (Intercord, 1997)

References

External links

1946 births
American rock guitarists
American male guitarists
Living people
People from Hicksville, New York
Guitarists from Philadelphia
20th-century American guitarists
20th-century American male musicians